John Short (born January 31, 1937) is a Canadian sports journalist and broadcaster. He writes a column for the Edmonton Sun. Short formerly worked for the Canadian Press, Edmonton Journal, as well as the Edmonton Oilers as public relations director. He has also hosted various sports-related radio shows. Short is a member of the Alberta Sports Hall of Fame (inducted 1988) and a recipient of the Chester Bell Memorial Award for excellence in sportswriting, as well as the Fred Sgambati national award for university sports coverage. He serves on the board of directors for the Alberta Sport Connection, and has also served on the Canadian Sports Hall of Fame Selection Committee.

References

1937 births
Living people
Alberta Sports Hall of Fame inductees
Canadian sports journalists
Edmonton Oilers personnel
Journalists from Toronto